Colophon montisatris is a species of beetle in family Lucanidae. It is endemic to South Africa.

References

Lucaninae
Insects of South Africa
Beetles described in 1988
Taxonomy articles created by Polbot